The Wufengshan Yangtze River Bridge is a two-decked suspension bridge carrying the Lianyungang–Zhenjiang high-speed railway and the  over the Yangtze.

History 
Plans to build a railway bridge at the location had been conceived since the 1960s, but were shelved due to building techniques at the time being insufficient to meet the requirements. Construction was started on 28 October 2015. The structure was closed on 29 December 2019 and the bridge was opened for railway traffic on 11 December 2020.

Engineering 
The bridge is fitted with several measures such as dampers and tensioners to reduce deformation from wind, which would inhibit high-speed rail operation.

See also
 List of bridges in China
 Bridges and tunnels across the Yangtze River
 List of longest suspension bridge spans

References 

Double-decker bridges
Bridges over the Yangtze River
Railway bridges in China
Bridges in Jiangsu
Bridges completed in 2020